Collège des Écossais (Scots College) can refer to several educational institutions in France:
Scottish College, Douai at University of Douai
Collège des Écossais, Montpellier
Scots College (Paris)

See also
Scots College (disambiguation)